David Steffen is an American politician and businessman. He represents Wisconsin's 4th Assembly district, which includes parts of Green Bay, Howard, Allouez and Ashwaubenon.

Education 
A native of Green Bay, Wisconsin, David Steffen graduated from Ashwaubenon High School and received his bachelor's degree from University of Wisconsin–Madison in political science.

Pre-political career 
Steffen spent twelve years in the education and non-profit sectors, most notably as the Director of Operations for the Legislative Leadership Institute Academy of Foreign Affairs in partnership with the Irish American University located in Dublin, Ireland.  Steffen had operational responsibilities in Dublin, Ireland; Bern, Switzerland; Tbilisi, Georgia; Baku, Azerbaijan and Kigali, Rwanda. He currently serves as a member of the U.S. Global Leadership Coalition on the Wisconsin Advisory Committee.

In 2000, Steffen was hired by the Green Bay Packers to facilitate their campaign efforts relating to a $300 million expansion of Lambeau Field. The success of this project paved the way for the new $130 million Titletown District currently under construction adjacent to Lambeau Field.

Steffen now resides in Howard, Wisconsin. He continues to own and operate multiple businesses including a farm-to-table food distribution company and a management agency for authors and public speakers.

Political career 
David Steffen was an aide for State Representative Mark Green in the 1990s. He also served on the Howard Village Board and the Brown County Board of Supervisors for eight years. He is a Republican. In November 2014, David Steffen was elected to the Wisconsin State Assembly. He was re-elected to a second term in 2016 and a third term in 2018. He currently serves as Chair of the International Affairs and Commerce committee.

References

External links 
 David Steffen Wisconsin State Legislature page

1971 births
Living people
Politicians from Green Bay, Wisconsin
University of Wisconsin–Madison College of Letters and Science alumni
Businesspeople from Wisconsin
Wisconsin city council members
County supervisors in Wisconsin
Republican Party members of the Wisconsin State Assembly
21st-century American politicians
People from Howard, Wisconsin
People from Ashwaubenon, Wisconsin